The 1984 Mississippi State Bulldogs football team represented Mississippi State University during the 1984 NCAA Division I-A football season.

Schedule

References

Mississippi State
Mississippi State Bulldogs football seasons
Mississippi State Bulldogs football